21501 Acevedo, provisional designation , is a stony Florian asteroid from the inner regions of the asteroid belt, approximately 2.4 kilometers in diameter.

The asteroid was discovered on 23 May 1998, by the LONEOS team at Anderson Mesa Station in Arizona, United States. It was named for Tony Acevedo, staff member at the Arecibo Observatory in Puerto Rico.

Orbit and classification 

Acevedo is a member of the Flora family, one of the largest families of stony asteroids. It orbits the Sun in the inner main-belt at a distance of 2.1–2.5 AU once every 3 years and 6 months (1,286 days). Its orbit has an eccentricity of 0.07 and an inclination of 6° with respect to the ecliptic.

The body's observation arc begins almost 20 years prior to its official discovery observation, with a precovery taken at Palomar Observatory in November 1978.

Physical characteristics 

Acevedo has been characterized as a common S-type asteroid by Pan-STARRS photometric survey.

Lightcurve 

In August 2013, a fragmentary rotational lightcurve of Acevedo was obtained from photometric observations by astronomers at the Palomar Transient Factory in California. Lightcurve analysis gave a provisional rotation period of  hours with a brightness amplitude of 0.10 magnitude.

Diameter and albedo estimate 

The Collaborative Asteroid Lightcurve Link assumes an albedo of 0.24 – which derives from 8 Flora, the largest member and namesake of this orbital family – and calculates a diameter of 2.4 kilometers with an absolute magnitude of 15.25.

Naming 

This minor planet was named in honour of Tony Acevedo (born 1950), staff member at the Arecibo Observatory in Puerto Rico, working as multimedia graphic designer and media officer. The approved naming citation was published by the Minor Planet Center on 18 July 2008 .

References

External links 
 Asteroid Lightcurve Database (LCDB), query form (info )
 Dictionary of Minor Planet Names, Google books
 Asteroids and comets rotation curves, CdR – Observatoire de Genève, Raoul Behrend
 Discovery Circumstances: Numbered Minor Planets (20001)-(25000) – Minor Planet Center
 
 

021501
021501
Named minor planets
19980523